Katsu may refer to:

Entertainment
Katsu (band), from Central Pennsylvania
KATSU!, manga by Mitsuru Adachi
"Katsu!" (ja), a 1984 song by Shibugakitai
Katsucon, an annual anime convention in Maryland

Other
Katsu (Zen), a shout used in East Asian Chan and Zen Buddhism, as well as in the martial arts
Deep fried cutlet in Japanese cuisine:
Chicken katsu, fried chicken cutlet
Tonkatsu, fried pork cutlet
Katsudon, tonkatsu served in a bowl with rice
Gyukatsu, fried beef cutlet
Kappo, resuscitation techniques also known as katsu

People
People named Katsu include:
Surname
Alma Katsu (born 1959), American writer of adult fiction
Katsu Kaishu (Awa Katsu) (1823–1899), Japanese statesman and naval officer
Katsu Kokichi (1802–1850), Japanese samurai 
Manami Katsu (born 1994), Japanese professional wrestler
Masanori Katsu (1879–1957), Japanese bureaucrat
Minami Katsu (born 1998), Japanese professional golfer
Shintaro Katsu (1931–1997), Japanese actor
Tou Katsu (born 1982), Japanese actor and model 

Name
KATSU (angela), Japanese musician, member of pop band angela
KATSU, graffiti artist
Katsu Aki (born 1961), manga artist
Katsu Goto (1862–1889), Japanese merchant and interpreter
Katsu Kanai (born 1936), Japanese film director
Katsu Kamisaka (born 1892), Japanese Lieutenant colonel
Maedagawa Katsu (1939–1998), Japanese sumo wrestler
Katsu Naito (born 1964), Japanese photographer
 Katsu (geisha) (active ca. 1800–1810), courtesan in Edo, achieved the ranking Oiran, premier class prostitute. Katsu was a woman of letters and associated with the intellectual elite (bunjin) of her days

See also

Japanese curry or curry sauce, sometimes referred to inaccurately as "katsu" or "katsu curry" in the UK

Japanese-language surnames
Japanese masculine given names